The Hyatt Regency Dubai is a luxury, five-star hotel located on Deira Corniche in Dubai, United Arab Emirates. It is the first Hyatt Hotel in UAE. It has 421 rooms and an additional complex of 388 apartments called The Galleria Residence.

History
The construction of the hotel began in 1977 backed by the Sheikh Rashid bin Saeed Al Maktoum, the Ruler of Dubai. It was opened to the public on 5 May 1980. Frank Kelly Design Architect, Emad Khaja Project Architect, Resident Architect, Garry Whitney, Interiors, Project Associate, Ben Worley of the design house ‘3D International’ of Houston, Texas designed the building for Abdul Wahab Galadari. Contractors were Cementation International, headed by Mike Slater of Great Britain.

Overview
It is one of the first steel buildings in Dubai. The Structural Consultant was Joe Colaco, and it has been built to U.S. Building Standards in all aspects. Interior Designer &  NOT the Architect was Gary Whitney. The hotel has 3 restaurants including Al Dawaar (revolving restaurant), Miyako (Japanese) and The Kitchen (international). 4 bars include Hibiki Karaoke Lounge, Carpenter's Bar, The Bar & Pool Bar.

References

External links
 Hyatt Regency Dubai

Design Architect: Frank Kelly, Proj. Architect: Emad Khaja, Interior Designer: Gary Whitney.

Hotels in Dubai
Hyatt Hotels and Resorts
Buildings and structures with revolving restaurants
Hotels established in 1980
Hotel buildings completed in 1980
1980 establishments in the United Arab Emirates